Yury Vladimirovich Maksimov (born April 11, 1978, Fryazino, Moscow Oblast, USSR) is a Russian entrepreneur and programmer. He co-founded Positive Technologies, serving as its CEO from 2007 to 2021. In 2021, he was appointed advisor to the Minister for Digital Development, Communications, and Mass Media of the Russian Federation on a voluntary basis.

According to Forbes, Maksimov's fortune is estimated at USD 450 million (as of 2020).

Biography

Early years 

Yury Maksimov was born on April 11, 1978, in the scientific town of Fryazino (Moscow Oblast) into a family of engineers. His parents, Vladimir and Lyudmila, worked at the 50th Anniversary of the USSR Plant in Fryazino. He was the family's second son (his elder brother, Dmitry Maksimov, is also a co-founder of Positive Technologies).

In 1995, Maksimov finished school and entered the physics department of Moscow State University. There he developed software for modeling and analyzing problems of information transmission in heterogeneous networks. He graduated as a specialist in this field in 2001.

In 2004, Maksimov completed his post-graduate studies at Moscow State University.

Career start 

Starting in his freshman year, Maksimov combined his studies with a programming job at Oktava+, a maker of precision instrumentation. There he began to develop his own ERP-type software for the company's measuring systems and internal operations, as well as manage international projects for the supply and implementation of foreign solutions for domestic companies and the export of Russian solutions.

Positive Technologies 

In 2002, Maksimov founded Positive Technologies together with his brother Dmitry and friend Evgeny Kireev. The company's first product was the XSpider vulnerability scanner, developed by Dmitry Maksimov.

The company's first office, located in Altufyevo in northern Moscow, initially had a staff of six: the three founders, a sales manager, an office manager, and a programmer.

CEO (2007–2021) 

From 2004 to 2007, Yury Maksimov served as technical director of Positive Technologies.

In 2007, he took over as CEO of Positive Technologies. The gradual transformation of the shareholder structure led to Maksimov owning more than 50% of the company.

International expansion 

Having set up its first overseas office in 2011 in the UK, Positive Technologies then opened offices in Italy and South Korea in 2012 and in India, the UAE, Tunisia, and the U.S. in 2013.

In 2014, Maksimov decided to split Positive Technologies into two companies: Russian and Swiss, with an independent development arm in Brno, Czech Republic, and sales offices worldwide. In 2021, it was reported that Yury Maksimov had sold his stake in the foreign legal entities to the top management of the Swiss company.

Change of CEO 

In 2020, Yury Maksimov announced his intention to leave the post of CEO. He entrusted the task of appointing a new CEO to the top management of Positive Technologies. In 2021, after an open discussion, the position was given to Denis Baranov.

Positive Technologies goes with a direct listing 

In 2020, Maksimov announced that Positive Technologies would be listed on the stock exchange.

In December 2021, Positive Group carried out a direct listing on the Moscow Exchange, becoming the first Russian cybersecurity company to go public.

Retaining a majority stake in the company, Yury Maksimov took on the role of chairman of the Board of Directors of PJSC Positive Group.

U.S. sanctions 

On April 15, 2021, U.S. President Joe Biden signed a decree to impose sanctions on six Russian IT companies "that provide support to the Russian Intelligence Services' cyber program." Among them was one of the legal entities of Positive Technologies' Russian structure. The company was accused of supporting government agencies and holding major cybersecurity events which intelligence officers allegedly used to recruit hackers. Maksimov denied all the accusations.

Following the imposition of sanctions, all American contracts with Positive Technologies were terminated. This had almost zero impact on the company's business in Russia.

Personal life 

Maksimov is married with one daughter.

References

External links 

 Ловец хакеров: как программист Юрий Максимов построил компанию с миллиардной стоимостью и попал под санкции США
 This $500 Million Russian Cyber Mogul Planned To Take His Company Public—Then America Accused It Of Hacking For Putin's Spies

21st-century Russian businesspeople
Russian computer programmers
1978 births
Living people
Russian technology company founders